W. Tom Sawyer, Jr. (born March 17, 1949) is an American politician and businessperson from Maine. A Republican, Sawyer represented Bangor, Maine in the Maine Senate from 2000 to 2004, when he was defeated for re-election by Democrat Joe Perry.

He served on the Bangor City Council from 1986 to 1993, including a year (1989) as the ceremonial mayor.

While campaigning for the State Senate in 2002, Sawyer said his top priorities were "the economy, the environment and education", including lower taxes for businesses.

A businessperson, Sawyer has been an investor and partner in a number of ventures, including Bangor Historic Raceway, Turtle Head Marina,  and Southwest Harbor Boat Marina.

References

1949 births
Living people
Republican Party Maine state senators
Businesspeople from Maine
University of Denver alumni
University of Maine alumni
Mayors of Bangor, Maine
Bangor City Council members
21st-century American politicians